Jeanne Duval (– c. 1862) was a Haitian-born actress and dancer of mixed French and black African ancestry. For 20 years, she was the muse of French poet and art critic Charles Baudelaire. They met in 1842 when Duval left Haiti for France, and the two remained together, albeit stormily, for the next two decades. Duval is said to have been the woman whom Baudelaire loved most in his life after his mother. She was born in Haiti on an unknown date, sometime around 1820.

Poems of Baudelaire's that are dedicated to Duval or pay her homage include "Le balcon" (The Balcony), "Parfum exotique" (Exotic Perfume), "La chevelure" (The Hair), "Sed non satiata" (Yet she is not satisfied), "Le serpent qui danse" (The Dancing Serpent), and "Une charogne" (A Carcass).

Baudelaire called her "mistress of mistresses" and his "Vénus Noire" ("Black Venus"), and it is believed that Duval symbolized to him the dangerous beauty, sexuality, and mystery of a Creole woman in mid-19th century France.  She lived at 6, rue de la Femme-sans-tête (Street of the Headless Woman) on the Ile Saint-Louis, near the Hôtel Pimodan.

Édouard Manet, a friend of Baudelaire, painted Duval in his 1862 painting Baudelaire's Mistress, Reclining. She was, by this time, going blind.

Duval may have died of syphilis as early as 1862, five years before Baudelaire, who also died of syphilis. Other sources claim that Duval survived Baudelaire. Nadar claimed to have seen Duval, last, in 1870—by this time she was on crutches, suffering heavily from syphilis.

Popular culture
Jeanne Duval serves as a main character in Caribbean author Nalo Hopkinson's The Salt Roads, a work of historic fiction, and in the title story of the collection Black Venus by Angela Carter. Tinge Krishnan's  film My Heart Laid Bare is about the life of Jeanne Duval called "the Big Breast, big Bank Girl.

The noted American conceptual artist Lorraine O'Grady developed a 16-diptych photo-installation featuring paired images of Charles Baudelaire and Jeanne Duval titled Flowers of Evil and Good. Preliminary studies for this installation have been exhibited in the Institute of Contemporary Art, Boston, the Thomas Erben Gallery, New York, and Galerie Fotohof in Salzburg, Austria. O'Grady has written extensively about the relationship of Baudelaire and Duval in Mousse Magazine and Pétunia: magazine féministe d’art contemporain et de loisirs.

Scottish artist Maud Sulter created several artworks inspired by Duval, using images such as her photograph by Nadar, and self-portraits of the artist. Many of these were displayed in a solo show at the Scottish National Portrait Gallery titled Jeanne Duval: A Melodrama.

In addition, Jeanne Duval is the inspiration for a song titled "Street of Roses" by then-Soviet heavy metal band Aria on the 1987 album Hero of Asphalt.

"Mademoiselle Baudelaire", by Yslaire, is a 2021 biographical graphic novel about her life from Europe Comics.

References

External links
20 English translations of Baudelaire's poem "The Balcony", addressed to Jeanne Duval

19th-century French actresses
French stage actresses
1820 births
1862 deaths
People from Jacmel
19th-century Haitian people
Haitian stage actresses
Haitian people of Mulatto descent
Deaths from syphilis
Haitian emigrants to France
Muses
Charles Baudelaire